{{DISPLAYTITLE:C20H21NO4}}
The molecular formula C20H21NO4 (molar mass: 339.38 g/mol) may refer to:
 Canadine
 Dicentrine, an alkaloid
 Nantenine, an alkaloid
 Papaverine, an opium alkaloid used primarily in the treatment of visceral spasm